In folklore, a bullet cast from silver is often one of the few weapons that are effective against a werewolf or witch. The term silver bullet is also a metaphor for a simple, seemingly magical, solution to a difficult problem: for example, penicillin circa 1930 was a "silver bullet" that allowed doctors to treat and successfully cure many bacterial infections.

In folklore
Some authors asserted that the idea of the werewolf's supposed vulnerability to silver dates back to the Beast of Gévaudan, a man-eating animal killed by the hunter Jean Chastel in the year 1767. However, the allegations of Chastel purportedly using a gun loaded with silver bullets are derived from a distorted detail based primarily on Henri Pourrat's Histoire fidèle de la bête en Gévaudan (1946). In this novel, the French writer  imagines that the beast was shot thanks to fictitious medals of the Virgin Mary, worn by Jean Chastel in his hat and then melted down to make bullets. An account of a Jämte about were-bears in 1936 attributes bullets of silver as the method of killing. Swedish folklore tends to ascribe silver bullets as a catch all weapon against creatures, as wizards or the skogsrå, that are "hard" against regular ammunition. 

In the Brothers Grimm fairy-tale of The Two Brothers, a bullet-proof witch is shot down by silver buttons, fired from a gun.

In some epic folk songs about Bulgarian rebel leader Delyo, he is described as invulnerable to normal weapons, driving his enemies to cast a silver bullet in order to murder him.

Lone Ranger
Silver bullets also act as a calling card for Lone Ranger in his adventures. The masked man decided to use bullets forged from the precious metal as a symbol of justice, law and order, and to remind himself and others that life has value and the decision to shoot someone is not to be taken lightly. In the 3rd episode, his friend, who will be making his bullets for him, mentions killing villains with the bullets and the Lone Ranger explains that he will not shoot to kill; he will let the law dispense justice. The silver bullets will be as symbols of justice. Whether he actually used silver bullets in his guns varies depending on story and medium. In the radio series, the Lone Ranger used only lead bullets as weapons, while the silver bullets were used symbolically. In the 1981 feature film, The Lone Ranger used silver bullets in his guns as he was told that silver was far more solid than lead slugs and provided a straighter shot. The Lone Ranger's usage of bullets made from valuable metal like silver is satirized in an episode of Robot Chicken where after the Ranger expertly shoots a tin can in the air, his sidekick Tonto laments that the amount of silver the Ranger thoughtlessly wasted could have bought enough food to feed Tonto's entire village for a year.

Ballistic effectiveness
Silver bullets differ from lead bullets in several respects. Lead has a 10% higher density than silver, so a silver bullet will have a little less mass than a lead bullet of identical dimensions. Pure silver is less malleable than lead and falls between lead and copper in terms of hardness (1.5 < 2.5 < 3.0 Mohs) and shear modulus (5.6 < 30 < 48 GPa). A silver bullet accepts the rifling of a gun barrel.

The terminal impact is somewhat speculative and will depend on a variety of factors including bullet size and shape, flight distance, and target material. At short ranges, the silver bullet will most likely give better penetration due to its higher shear modulus, and will not deform as much as a lead bullet. A 2007 episode of MythBusters demonstrated a greater penetration depth of lead bullets vs. silver bullets. Results cannot be considered conclusive, however, as the show utilized a  lead slug in a .45-caliber Colt long shell vs a lighter,  silver slug fired at closer range. Another MythBusters episode, from 2012, showed that silver bullets are less accurate than lead bullets when fired from the M1 Garand. Michael Briggs also did some experiments with silver bullets compared to lead bullets. After making a custom mold to ensure that the sizes of the silver bullets were comparable to the lead bullets, he fired them. He found that the silver bullets were slightly slower than the lead bullets and less accurate.

See also
Golden hammer
List of topics characterized as pseudoscience
M829A1 Sabot round, nicknamed the Silver Bullet
Magic bullet (medical)
No Silver Bullet
Silver Bullet
 Silver lining

References

External links

 More on the confusion between silver bullet and magic bullet
 Casting Silver Bullets
 Lone Ranger Go Away. Classic 1964 Article

English-language idioms
Folklore
Metaphors referring to objects
Silver